is a Japanese horror comedy film, released in 2001. It is based on a novel by Kenji Ohtsuki directed by Naoyuki Tomomatsu, in which teenage girls turn into zombies.

Plot
In the near future, the entire world is struck with a bizarre malady which affects every girl between the ages of 14 and 16 years old.

Victims first experience a period of giddiness called "Near Death Happiness" ("NDH" or 臨死遊戯状態) before expiring.  Within minutes of death the victim rises again as a flesh-eating zombie—a "Stacy". These Stacies run amok until they are cut into pieces in an act called a "Repeat-Kill" (再殺).

The government has organized the poorly trained "Romero Repeat-Kill Troops," who ride around on garbage trucks, ordered to act out the disposal of the Stacies.  By law, a Stacy may only be Repeat-Killed by her loved ones or the Romero Repeat Kill Troops.

Through research, it is discovered that a key to the Stacy phenomenon is the "Butterfly Twinkle Powder" (BTP or 蝶羽状輝徽粉) that accumulates on the Stacies' skin.

Cast
(in alphabetical order)
Norman England - Jeff
Tomoka Hayashi - Nozomi
Yukijiro Hotaru
Natsuki Katō - Eiko
Shirô Misawa
Masayoshi Nogami - Father
Toshinori Omi - Shibukawa
Kenji Otsuki
Hinako Saeki
Youji Tanaka - Rokuyama
Donbei Tsuchihira
Yasutaka Tsutsui - Dr. Inugami Sukekiyo
Shungicu Uchida

Soundtrack
The music featured in the movie is by Tokusatsu, of which Kenji Otsuki is a member.

Further reading

External links
 
 

2001 horror films
2001 comedy horror films
Films directed by Naoyuki Tomomatsu
Japanese comedy horror films
Zombie comedy films
2001 films
2001 comedy films
2000s Japanese films
2000s Japanese-language films